The following lists events that happened during 1898 in South Africa.

Incumbents
 Governor of the Cape of Good Hope and High Commissioner for Southern Africa:Alfred Milner.
 Governor of the Colony of Natal: Charles Bullen Hugh Mitchell.
 State President of the Orange Free State: Martinus Theunis Steyn.
 State President of the South African Republic: Paul Kruger.
 Prime Minister of the Cape of Good Hope: John Gordon Sprigg.
 Prime Minister of the Colony of Natal: Henry Binns.

Events
March
 26 – The Sabie Game Reserve, renamed to Kruger National Park in 1926, is proclaimed in the Official Gazette of the South African Republic, the first officially designated game reserve.

Unknown date
 Benjamin Jennings Caddy, militant trade unionist, immigrates to South Africa from Australia at the age of 17.

Births
 6 June – Jim Fouché, second State President of South Africa, in Wepener, Orange Free State. (d. 1980)

Deaths
 - 26 March William Guybon Atherstone, medical practitioner, naturalist and geologist, (b. 1814)

Railways

Railway lines opened

 Cape Midland – Bamboo Junction to Cape Collieries, .
 3 March – Cape Midland – Middelburg to Graaff-Reinet, .
 13 June – Natal – Clairwood to Wests in Durban, .
 1 October – Transvaal – Pretoria to Potgietersrus, .
 15 October – Namaqualand – Garracoop Junction to Nababeep, .
 1 November – Free State – Theunissen to Winburg, .
 1 December – Natal – Tongaat to Tugela, .

Locomotives
Cape
 Two new Cape gauge locomotive types enter service on the Cape Government Railways (CGR):
 Six 4-4-0 3rd Class Wynberg Tender locomotives in passenger service on the suburban lines in Cape Town.
 A fourth batch of thirty-three 6th Class 4-6-0 steam locomotives. In 1912 they will be designated Class 6D on the South African Railways (SAR).

Free State
 The Oranje-Vrijstaat Gouwerment-Spoorwegen takes delivery of three of its final six new Cape 6th Class locomotives before its railway operations are taken over by the Imperial Military Railways. In 1912 they will be designated  on the SAR.

Transvaal
 The independent Pretoria-Pietersburg Railway in the Zuid-Afrikaansche Republiek (Transvaal Republic) places five 55 Tonner  tank locomotives in service. In 1912 they will be designated Class D on the SAR.

References

 
South Africa
Years in South Africa